Cutan may refer to:

 Cutan (polymer), a biopolymer found on the surface of some plants
 Cutan (soil), an element of the structure of soil
Clay cutan

See also 
 Kutan (disambiguation)
 Qutan (disambiguation)